NVM is the second studio album by Seattle, Washington-based pop punk band Tacocat. It was released on February 25, 2014 on the Hardly Art label. The band wrote the album as a song for song response to Nevermind by Nirvana.

Track listing
"You Never Came Back"
"Bridge to Hawaii"
"Crimson Wave"
"Stereogram"
"Pocket Full of Primrose"
"Psychedelic Quinceañera"
"Time Pirate"
"This Is Anarchy"
"Hey Girl"
"Party Trap"
"F.U. #8"
"Alien Girl" (The Crabs cover)
"Snow Day"

Personnel
Tacocat
Lelah Maupin
Bree McKenna
Emily Nokes
Eric Randall

Production
Chris Hanzser – mastering
Conrad Uno – engineer

References

Tacocat albums
Hardly Art albums
2014 albums